Pakistan Services Limited, doing business as Pearl-Continental Hotels & Resorts (also abbreviated to PC Hotels), is the largest chain of five-star hotels in Pakistan with properties in Karachi, Lahore, Rawalpindi, Peshawar, Gwadar, Bhurban, Muzaffarabad. and Malam Jabba, and under construction in Multan, Attabad Lake, Mirpur, Hayatabad, and Hyderabad.   Pearl-Continental Hotels is a subsidiary of Hashoo Group who also operate Marriott Hotels in Islamabad and Karachi through a franchise system. Hashoo group has recently launched a new chain of four-star hotels by the name of PC LEGACY. PC LEGACY Naran is functional and operating in Naran and another is being constructed in Nasirabad, Hunza.

The Pearl-Continental Hotel in Karachi was inaugurated by President Muhammad Ayub Khan on 10 May 1964 and was the first five-star hotel in Pakistan which hosted various prominent figures from across the globe including Queen Elizabeth II, Nelson Mandela, and King Hussain of Jordan, among others. Cabin crew from Lufthansa, SAS, and Swissair would stay there during their transits. It was a member of the Leading Hotels of the World for over a decade. A New Hotel was built for Lahore and Rawalpindi in 1967 with another branch opening in Peshawar in 1975.

Karachi Incident 
On Thursday night 26 May, 2022 the roof of the 5-star property collapsed down at Karachi's Pearl-Continental Hotel. According to the reports one person was killed and three others injured after the ceiling of the five-star hotel caved in on top of them. The incident occurred inside the Marco Polo Hall at the hotel where an event was under way.

Gallery

References

 
Hotel chains in Pakistan
Hospitality companies of Pakistan
Companies listed on the Pakistan Stock Exchange
Pakistani brands